A frieze is the wide central section of an entablature.

Frieze may also refer to:
Frieze (textile), a napped woolen cloth made from Frisian wool
Frieze Art Fair, a London art fair
Frieze (magazine), a London-based art magazine
Frieze group, a mathematical concept
 Frieze (horse), a British Thoroughbred racehorse and broodmare best known for winning the 1952 Epsom Oaks

People
Alan M. Frieze (born 1945), English mathematician
Arkley Frieze (1914–1969), American politician, Missouri senator
Henry Simmons Frieze (1817–1889), American educator and administrator

See also
Frieza, a character in Dragon Ball media